Anna Pasiarová (born 18 December 1949) is a Slovak cross-country skier. She competed at the 1976 Winter Olympics and the 1984 Winter Olympics.

Cross-country skiing results
All results are sourced from the International Ski Federation (FIS).

Olympic Games

World Championships

World Cup

Season standings

Individual podiums

4 podiums

References

External links
 

1949 births
Living people
Slovak female cross-country skiers
Olympic cross-country skiers of Czechoslovakia
Cross-country skiers at the 1976 Winter Olympics
Cross-country skiers at the 1984 Winter Olympics
People from Poprad District
Sportspeople from the Prešov Region